(2,2,3-Trimethyl-5-oxocyclopent-3-enyl)acetyl-CoA synthase (2-oxo-Delta3-4,5,5-trimethylcyclopentenylacetyl-CoA synthetase) is an enzyme with systematic name ((1R)-2,2,3-trimethyl-5-oxocyclopent-3-enyl)acetate:CoA ligase (AMP-forming). This enzyme catalyses the following chemical reaction

 [(1R)-2,2,3-trimethyl-5-oxocyclopent-3-enyl]acetate + ATP + CoA  AMP + diphosphate + [(1R)-2,2,3-trimethyl-5-oxocyclopent-3-enyl]acetyl-CoA

This enzyme is isolated from Pseudomonas putida.

References

External links 
 

EC 6.2.1